Hikmet Murat Salar (born 23 November 1976) is a Turkish former professional footballer and currently manager of SV Arminia Hannover.

Salar, born to an Egyptian mother and Turkish father in Germany, played a total of 49 Süper Lig games throughout his footballing career in Turkey. Despite having won 4 caps for the Turkish U-18 team in 1994, Salar later expressed an interest in playing for the Egyptian national side.

Managerial career
On 22 April 2014, Salar was named new manager of German club KFC Uerdingen 05. He also continued to play for TSC Vahdet Braunschweig in the sixth-tier Landesliga Braunschweig. With the club facing relegation from the 2014–15 Regionalliga he was sacked as Uerdingen manager on 18 May 2015.

In April 2016 he was named new manager of SV Arminia Hannover.

References

External links 
 
 
 

1976 births
Living people
Sportspeople from Hildesheim
Footballers from Lower Saxony
Turkish people of Egyptian descent
Turkish footballers
Association football midfielders
Turkey youth international footballers
Süper Lig players
SV Werder Bremen II players
Bursaspor footballers
Balıkesirspor footballers
Hertha BSC II players
Gaziantepspor footballers
Türkiyemspor Berlin players
Gençlerbirliği S.K. footballers
Diyarbakırspor footballers
Tennis Borussia Berlin players
Çaykur Rizespor footballers
Altay S.K. footballers
Adana Demirspor footballers
Orduspor footballers
German footballers
German people of Turkish descent